Farajabad (also Romanized as Farajābād) is a village in Palanga Rural District, Shahrud District, Khalkhal County, Ardabil Province, Iran. At the 2006 census, its population was 76, in 20 families.

References 

Tageo

Towns and villages in Khalkhal County